Joshua Lionel Cowen (August 25, 1877 – September 8, 1965), born Joshua Lionel Cohen, was an American inventor and the cofounder of Lionel Corporation, a manufacturer of model railroads and toy trains.

Early life

Cowen was born in New York on August 25, 1877; he had eight siblings. His parents were Jewish immigrants german. Although Cowen often gave his birthdate as 1880, he was actually born three years earlier. Cowen legally changed his last name from Cohen in 1910 for reasons unknown.

Cowen studied at Columbia University and the City College of New York. Cowen built his first toy train at age seven, attaching a small steam engine to a wooden locomotive he had carved. The engine exploded, damaging his parents' kitchen. 

Cowen received his first patent in 1899, for a device that ignited a photographer's flash. The same year, Cowen received a defense contract from the United States Navy to produce mine fuses, earning $12,000.

Lionel Corporation 
Cowen and one of his partners founded Lionel Corporation in New York City in 1900. Sources disagree on what inspired Cowen to establish the Lionel Corporation. According to The New York Times, he devised a battery-powered fan for his shop, then connected the fan's motor to a small model train. The Hackensack, New Jersey, Record states that Cowen designed his model train after seeing another, stationary, train in a shop window. A Manhattan shopkeeper bought Cowen's first electric train in 1901 and used it as a storefront display. After customers indicated that they wanted to buy the display, the shopkeeper bought six more trains.

Lionel had become the world's largest toy manufacturers by the early 1950s, even as interest in model trains had declined. Cowen retired in 1959, selling his 55,000 shares of Lionel stock to his great-nephew Roy Cohn. He died on September 8, 1965, in Palm Beach, Florida, and is interred at Union Field Cemetery in Brooklyn, New York.

References

Further reading 

1877 births
1965 deaths
20th-century American inventors
City College of New York alumni
Columbia University alumni
Cooper Union alumni
Toy inventors
Lionel, LLC
American people of Lithuanian-Jewish descent
Jewish American inventors
People from the Lower East Side